Microhexura idahoana is a species of mygalomorph spider in the family Microhexuridae. It is found in the United States.

References

Further reading 

 
 
 
 
 

Mygalomorphae
Articles created by Qbugbot
Spiders described in 1945
Spiders of the United States